The 1912–13 Cincinnati Bearcats men's basketball team represented the University of Cincinnati during the 1912–13 college men's basketball season. The head coach was Russell Easton, coaching his third season with the Bearcats.

Schedule

|-

References

Cincinnati Bearcats men's basketball seasons
Cincinnati Bearcats men's basketball team
Cincinnati Bearcats men's basketball team
Cincinnati Bearcats men's basketball team